The 2015–16 Montenegrin First League was the tenth season of the top-tier football in Montenegro. The season began on 8 August 2015 and ended on 29 May 2016. Rudar are the defending champions.

Teams 
FK Iskra Danilovgrad, the 2014-15 Second League champion, got promoted to the top level for the first time. FK Dečić won 7–1 on aggregate against two-times Montenegrin champion FK Mogren in the promotion play-offs, and returns to the First League after just one year of absence.

Stadia and locations 

Source: Scoresway

League table

Results
The schedule consisted of three rounds. During the first two rounds, each team played each other once home and away for a total of 22 games. The pairings of the third round were then set according to the standings after the first two rounds, giving every team a third game against each opponent for a total of 33 games per team.

First and second round

Third round
Key numbers for pairing determination (number marks position after 22 games):

Relegation play-offs
The 10th-placed team (against the 3rd-placed team of the Second League) and the 11th-placed team (against the runners-up of the Second League) will both compete in two-legged relegation play-offs after the end of the season.

Summary

Matches

Iskra won 8–2 on aggregate.

Petrovac won 1–0 on aggregate.

Top goalscorers
The top scorer was won the 2016 Radio Montenegro Trophy.

References

External links 
 Soccerway

Montenegrin First League seasons
Monte
1